Ophiocordyceps robertsii, known in New Zealand as vegetable caterpillar (Māori: āwhato or āwheto) is an entomopathogenic fungus belonging to the order Hypocreales (Ascomycota) in the family Ophiocordycipitaceae. It invades the caterpillars of leaf-litter dwelling moths and turns them into fungal mummies, sending up a fruiting spike above the forest floor to shed its spores. Caterpillars eat the spores whilst feeding on leaf litter to complete the fungal life cycle. Evidence of this fungus can be seen when small brown stems push through the forest floor: underneath will be the dried remains of the host caterpillar. This species was first thought by Europeans to be a worm or caterpillar that burrowed from the top of a tree to the roots, where it exited and then grew a shoot of the plant out of its head. It was the first fungus named in New Zealand.

Uses
The parasitised caterpillar has been used by Māori as a food or ink for traditional tā moko tattoos. The charred caterpillars were mixed with fat to make a rich dark ink. Scientists suggest that the fungus produces antiseptic chemicals that can prevent infection. In the early 20th century, mummified caterpillars were sold to tourists as a curio.

References

External links
  Ophiocordyceps robertsii discussed in RNZ Critter of the Week, 21 July 2017

Fungi described in 1837
Fungi of New Zealand
Ophiocordycipitaceae
Taxa named by William Jackson Hooker